Mark Joseph Rutherford is a London born musician, composer and producer whose work appears on records, video games, television programmes, commercials and feature films.

Early years
From the age of nine, Rutherford studied classical guitar and classical music theory, learning the Segovia Technique under the guidance of tutor Leslie Nicholls (LGSM BA Hons), a former pupil of the highly acclaimed Professor Adele Kramer. He also learned to play the piano while studying composition and classical music history.

Records
Rutherford was a guitarist and songwriter with Jimmy The Hoover. The band, managed by Malcolm McLaren. had a top 20 hit, and toured with bands such as Siouxsie and the Banshees and Bow Wow Wow.

He then travelled to Central and Eastern Africa, spending a year and a half living with, and recording, native tribes people. On his return, and under the mentorship of Grammy Award Winning Record Producer Steve Levine, Rutherford learned the techniques of record production, working alongside artists and musicians including Dave Gilmour, Boy George, Bonnie Tyler, Labi Sifri, Barrington Levy and Motorhead's Lemmy.

In 1991 Rutherford secured a studio space at William Orbit’s Guerrilla Studios in Crouch End, London. He shared this with the DJ John Gosling, aka Sugar J. Here Rutherford collaborated with Orbit on many projects including remixes for Peter Gabriel, The Christians, Psychic TV and Yothu Yindi. He also shared co-production and co-writing credits on Orbit projects including Bassomatic, Strange Cargo and Beth Orton.

Also in 1991, Rutherford began his collaborations with Goldie Goldie under the name of Rufige Kru and Metalheads. Their first record, along with DJ Freebase was "Krisp Biscuit/Killa Muffin", was released on Reinforced Records in 1992. This was followed by the "Dark Rider EP", featuring the tracks; "Darkrider", "Believe", "Menace" and "Jim Skreech". It was at this time that Goldie gave Rutherford the nickname "Darkus", a reference to the ‘darker’ sound Rutherford had brought to the sound of the EP.

Goldie and Rutherford were then asked by Synthetic Hardcore Phonography Records in Camden to write and produce a new record. This became the first Metalheads track "Terminator". For this track, Rutherford brought an Eventide H3000 Ultra-Harmonizer to the studio, a piece of equipment that he had previously been experimenting with at Steve Levine's studio. The H3000 was able to time-stretch in real time, meaning the pitch of any sound could be changed while keeping its original tempo.

Goldie and Rutherford wrote and produced three more tracks; "Kemistry", "Knowledge" and "Sinister" for what became the Metalheads' "Terminator EP". This was followed up later with the "Ghosts of My Life/Terminator 2" EP. Many of the Rutherford / Goldie tracks have been re-released and remixed in the years following their original release.

Peter Gabriel then invited Rutherford, alongside DJ Sugar J and Engineer Robert Hill, to create an album using contributions from artists who had gathered at one of Gabriel's "Real World Recording Weeks" at his Real World Studios in Box, Wiltshire. The result was the world music crossover album "Way Down Below Buffalo Hell" by Jam Nation. The album includes contributions from artists including Ayub Ogada, Alex Gifford (Propellerheads), Peter Gabriel, Galliano, Jocelyn Pook, Daniel Lanois, Billy Cobham, Karl Wallinger, Jah Wobble and the late Lucky Dube.

Mike Oldfield invited Rutherford to his studio to work on the album "Songs of Distant Earth". For this, Rutherford used field recordings he had previously made in Africa. Following the release of the album Oldfield asked Rutherford to remix the single "Let There Be Light".

Rutherford also worked with Einsturzende Neubauten after the band's producer Jon Caffery became aware of Rutherford's experimental style of production.

After Rutherford had remixed the single NNNAAAMMM he was invited to rehearse with the band in preparation for their upcoming tour.

Video games
Rutherford’s first game score in 2010 was for the 20th Century Fox, number one selling, Aliens vs. Predator. This was 70 minutes of live orchestral score recorded in Slovakia with the Istropolis Philharmonic Orchestra. For this score Rutherford made his own percussion kits constructed from bits of metal and various tools which were then scraped and hit with nails, sticks, brushes and mallets.

In 2013, Rutherford composed and produced the live orchestral score for Batman: Arkham Origins this time from Warner Brothers. The score was a combination of extreme synthesised elements and full live orchestral score performed by the Bratislava Symphony Orchestra.

2015 saw him scoring the Ubisoft game Assassin's Creed Chronicles. Rutherford collaborated on the music with Chris Jolley and Aaron Miller. The game is set in three countries; China, India and Russia, and to create these distinctive musical themes Rutherford used the world music experience gained during his time at Peter Gabriel's "Real World Studios".

The soundtrack for Dirty Bomb from Splash Damage is a combination of processed orchestral elements, electronica and abstract sounds made from a collection of bespoke instruments that Rutherford made. One of the instruments was made from a three-metre steel girder sitting on a galvanised metal box with various straps and bungee cords attached. He used a collection of vintage microphones to record the instrument, including an AKG D12 from the 1960s placed inside a metal box and an AKG D190 from the 1970s.

Rutherford has composed and produced the scores for the Sniper Elite tactical shooter video game series.

Film & TV 
Rutherford’s introduction to feature Films and TV came when Grammy award-winning producer Steve Levine offered him the opportunity to work in his studio in London. During this time his roles were engineering and programming. He also performed as an instrumentalist whilst working on feature films including the award-winning Planes, Trains and Automobiles, Eversmile, New Jersey and Mister Frost.

Following this, Rutherford composed music for the film This Is Not A Love Song, the first film to be streamed on the internet simultaneously with its cinema premiere at London's Leicester Square.

Rutherford's work with writer-director Chris Crow has involved him scoring the feature films Devil's Bridge, Panic Button, A Viking Saga: The Darkest Day  and The Lighthouse.

Rutherford's music has also featured in the films Hell's Kitchen, Blood Brothers, Sacred Planet and Peace One Day.

He has also composed the music for the short films including Fish Can't Fly and Dust. In 2014 he worked on the post-apocalyptic action-satire Get Some.

Rutherford's music can also be heard on television shows and documentaries including Channel 4's Body Shock series, The Twins Who Share a Brain, Horizon, 5th Gear, Minds Eye, Trading Spaces, Perfect Proposal, Visions of the Future, Horizon Space Tourists, Formula One and WWE Smackdown/Raw.

Selected film scores
 This Is Not A Love Song 
 Devils Bridge 
 The Darkest Day 
 Dust.
 Panic Button 
 Get Some
 The Lighthouse

Selected video game scores
 Aliens vs. Predator – Sega which at the time of its release became Sega's fastest selling game in the company's history. Chart position No. 1.
 Assassins Creed Chronicles – Climax Studios – Ubisoft
 NeverDead – Konami.
 Sniper Elite V2 – Rebellion Developments – 505 Games – Develop Audio Award Nominee Chart position No. 1
 LittleBigPlanet PS Vita Marvel Arcade – Sony Interactive Entertainment
 LittleBigPlanet DC Comics – Sony Interactive Entertainment
 Sniper Elite 3 – Rebellion Developments – 505 Games. Chart position No. 1
 Kill Zone Mercenary – Trailer – Guerrilla Games
 Dirty Bomb – Splash Damage
 Batman: Arkham Origins (mp) – Warner Brothers Interactive Entertainment. Chart position No. 1
 Sniper Elite 4 – Rebellion Developments – Develop Audio Award Nominee Chart position No. 2

Selected discography
 William Orbit – Strange Cargo 3William Orbit – Strange Cargo 3
Steve Levine – Life Aid Armenia
 Mike Oldfield – Songs of Distant Earth
 Peter Gabriel & Carl Wallinger – La Visite Est Terminée
 Peter Gabriel – Mercy Street
 Metalheadz – Dark Rider EP
 Metalheadz – Ghost of My Life EP
 Metalheadz – Krisp Biscuit/Killa Muffin
 Metalheadz – Terminator EP
 Jam Nation – Way Down Below Buffalo Hell
 Arthur Baker – Zone Rock
 Bassomatic – Science & Melody
 Beth Orton – Super Pinky Mandy
 Daniel Lanois – 454
 Einsturzende Neubauten – NNNAAAMMM
 Galliano – Meeting of the People
 Jah Wobble – Prehistoric Gran Prix
 Jane Sibery – Harmonix
 Lucky Dube – First Time
 Psychic TV – God Star

References

External links

Year of birth missing (living people)
Living people
British film score composers
British male film score composers
Video game composers